Southwestern College may refer to the following colleges in the United States:

Southwestern College (California)
Southwestern College (Kansas)
Southwestern College (New Mexico)
Southwestern College of Business and New England Technical Institute, now part of Lincoln Tech 
 Arizona Christian University, formerly Southwestern College

See also
Southwest University (disambiguation)
Southwestern University (disambiguation)
Southwestern Community College (disambiguation)
 The College at Southwestern, now L.R. Scarborough College
 Rhodes College, Memphis, Tennessee, formerly Southwestern at Memphis
 Southwest College, Houston, Texas
 Southwestern Assemblies of God University, in Waxahachie, Texas
 Southwestern Christian College, in Terrell, Texas
 South West College, Northern Ireland
 University of Texas Southwestern Medical Center at Dallas